Belinda Borneo (born 10 November 1966) is a British former professional tennis player.

Tennis career
A right-handed player, Borneo reached a career best singles ranking of 238 in the world. She featured in the singles main draw at Wimbledon on three occasions, without making it past the first round. At the 1990 Wimbledon Championships, she held match points in her loss to Carrie Cunningham.

Borneo was ranked as high as 84 in doubles and won one WTA Tour title, the 1992 Wellington Classic.

WTA Tour finals

Doubles (1–1)

ITF finals

Doubles: 16 (6–10)

References

External links
 
 

1966 births
Living people
British female tennis players
English female tennis players